The Case School of Engineering is the engineering school of Case Western Reserve University, a private research university in Cleveland, Ohio. It traces its roots to the 1880 founding of the Case School of Applied Science. The school was endowed by Leonard Case, Jr. in 1877 and became the Case Institute of Technology in 1947 until merging with Western Reserve University in 1967. It was officially named the Case School of Engineering in 1992.

Academic departments
 Biomedical Engineering
 Chemical Engineering
 Civil Engineering
 Computer Engineering
 Electrical Engineering & Computer Science
 Macromolecular Science & Engineering
 Materials Science and Engineering
 Mechanical and Aerospace Engineering

References

External links
Official site

Case Western Reserve University
Engineering schools and colleges in the United States
Engineering universities and colleges in Ohio
Educational institutions established in 1881
1881 establishments in Ohio